Kuhestan (also Romanized as Kūhestān) is a village in Khotbeh Sara Rural District, Kargan Rud District, Talesh County, Gilan Province, Iran. At the 2006 census, its population was 251, in 66 families.

References 

Populated places in Talesh County